DFC may refer to:

Science and technology
 Design for Cost, see Design for X
 DFC (cipher), decorrelated fast cipher
 Dfc, one of four subclassifications for subarctic climate
 Digital Film Console, made by AMS Neve
 Digital Fine Contrast
 Discovery Family Channel

Media and entertainment
 DFC (group), an American hip hop duo
 The DFC, British comic
 Dreamfall Chapters: The Longest Journey, a video game commonly abbreviated as DFC
 Dysfunctional Family Circus

Football clubs
 Darlington F.C., England
 Dartford F.C., England
 DFC Prag, Czech Republic
 Dordrechtse Football Club, former name of FC Dordrecht, Netherlands
 Dorking F.C., England
 Dumbarton F.C., Scotland
 Dundee F.C., Scotland
 Danubio F.C., Uruguay

Other topics
U.S. International Development Finance Corporation (DFC), an independent agency of the U.S. Government
Department for Communities, a government department in Northern Ireland
 Digital Future Coalition, US copyright advocacy group
 Distinguished Flying Cross (United Kingdom), medal
 Distinguished Flying Cross (United States), medal
Dedicated Freight Corridor Corporation of India, Indian infrastructure special purpose vehicle
 DFC New Zealand Limited, former financial enterprise